Woo Hyun (born 1964) is a South Korean actor, and former democracy activist.

Filmography

Film

Television series

Variety show

References

External links
 

Living people
People from Gwangju
South Korean male television actors
South Korean male film actors
South Korean male stage actors
South Korean male musical theatre actors
1964 births
Yonsei University alumni
Danyang U clan